Lu is a Tibetan style of folk music of a cappella songs, which are distinctively high in pitch with glottal vibrations.

References

Folk music genres
Tibetan culture